Aliya Khambikova (24 November 1999 – 7 November 2021) was a Russian professional volleyball player. She died at 21 due to illness.

References

1999 births
2021 deaths
Russian women's volleyball players
20th-century Russian women
21st-century Russian women